Muhammad Syarifuddin (born 17 October 1954) is an Indonesian jurist who serves as the 14th and current Chief Justice of the Supreme Court of Indonesia since 30 April 2020. He also serves as the Deputy Chief Justice of the Supreme Court Indonesia for judicial affairs, and previously served as the Supreme Court's head of supervision.

References

1954 births
Living people
Chief justices of the Supreme Court of Indonesia